Autopista, unha navallada á nosa terra is a 30-minute documentary directed by Llorenç Soler.   The documentary details the construction of the Atlantic highway in Galicia, Spain and highlights the popular resistance to its construction during the Spanish transition to democracy. The film was produced in 1977, two years after the death of the caudillo Francisco Franco, and offers a critical lens for understanding the problems and struggles facing the newly formed democracy.

Plot 
As with most films by Llorenç Soler, Autopista, unha navallada á nosa terra focuses on possibly exploitative practices via testimonials of the affected subjects.  This documentary explores the Galician farmers’ collective, political unification to fight the construction of a highway that would divide or "cut" Galicia into two parts (unha navallada, a wound).

To that end, it also serves as a political tool to create a certain awareness or consciousness of the issue for inspiring future activism. At the conclusion of the documentary, the narrator encourages the spectator to mobilize.

The film contrasts the concepts of modernization and "backwardness" to suggest a "colonial framework" for understanding the symbolic power represented by the highway and who it would benefit. In its footage, the film also notably documents rural life, culture, popular traditions and festivals in Galicia during the 70s.

References

1977 films
1977 documentary films
Galician-language films
1977 short films
1970s short documentary films
Spanish short documentary films